The 1957 College Football All-America team is composed of college football players who were selected as All-Americans by various organizations and writers that chose College Football All-America Teams in 1957. The seven selectors recognized by the NCAA as "official" for the 1957 season are (1) the Associated Press, (2) the United Press, (3) the American Football Coaches Association (AFCA), (4) the Football Writers Association of America (FWAA), (5) the International News Service (INS), (6) the Newspaper Enterprise Association (NEA), and (7) the Sporting News.  The ESPN College Football Encyclopedia lists the All-America Board (AAB) as an eighth official selector.

Consensus All-Americans
For the year 1957, the NCAA awards guide lists seven published All-American teams as "official" designations for purposes of its consensus determinations. The ESPN College Football Encyclopedia lists the All-America Board (AAB) as an eighth official selector. The following chart identifies the NCAA-recognized consensus All-Americans and displays which first-team designations they received.

All-American selections for 1957

Ends
Jim Phillips, Auburn (AAB, AFCA, AP-1, FWAA, INS-1, NEA-1, SN, UP-1, Time, WC)
Dick Wallen, UCLA (AAB, AFCA, AP-1, FWAA, INS-1, NEA-1, UP-2, Time, WC)
Jim Gibbons, Iowa (FWAA, INS-2, SN, AP-3, UP-1)
Fred Dugan, Dayton (FWAA, AP-2)
Les Walters, Penn State (AP-2)
Dave Kaiser, Michigan State (UP-2)
Dick Lasse, Syracuse (INS-2)
Gary Kapp, Utah State (INS-2)
Don Ellingsen, Washington State (AP-3, UP-3)
Buddy Dial, Rice (INS-2, UP-3)

Tackles
Alex Karras, Iowa (Outland Trophy, College and Pro Football Hall of Fame) (AAB, AP-1, FWAA, INS-1, NEA-1, SN, UP-1, Time, WC)
Lou Michaels, Kentucky  (AAB, AFCA, AP-1, FWAA, INS-2, NEA-1, SN, UP-1, Time, WC)
Charlie Krueger, Texas A&M  (AP-2, FWAA, INS-1, UP-2)
Tom Topping, Duke (FWAA, AP-3)
Bob Reifsnyder, Navy (AP-2, UP-2)
Jim McCusker, Pitt (AP-3, INS-2, UP-3)
Bill Leeka, UCLA (INS-2)
Larry Whitmire, Rice (INS-2)
Nick Mumley, Purdue (INS-2)
Dick Klein, Iowa (UP-3)

Guards
Bill Krisher, Oklahoma (AAB, AP-1, FWAA, INS-1, NEA-1, SN, UP-1, Time, WC)
Al Ecuyer, Notre Dame (AP-2, INS-1, SN, Time, UP-1, WC)
Aurealius Thomas, Ohio State (AAB, AFCA, AP-1, FWAA, INS-2, UP-2)
Bill Johnson, Tennessee (FWAA, NEA-1, AP-3, UP-3)
Jackie Simpson, Mississippi (AFCA, FWAA, AP-2)
Roy Hord, Jr., Duke (INS-2, UP-2)
Stan Renning, Montana (INS-2)
Don Wilson, Texas (INS-2)
Joe Palermo, Dartmouth (AP-3, UP-3)

Centers
Dan Currie, Michigan State (AAB, AFCA, AP-1, FWAA, INS-1, UP-2, Time, WC)
Bob Reifsnyder, Navy  (AFCA [tackle], FWAA, NEA-1)
Don Stephenson, Georgia Tech (AP-3, INS-2, SN, UP-1)
Bob Harrison, Oklahoma (AP-2)
Charlie Brueckman, Pittsburgh (INS-2, UP-3)
Jim Kernan, Army (INS-2)

Quarterbacks
King Hill, Rice (AAB, AFCA, AP-1, FWAA, UP-3, Time)
Lee Grosscup, Utah (AP-2, FWAA, INS-2, NEA-1, UP-2)
Tom Forrestal, Navy (INS-1, AP-3, UP-2)
Jim Van Pelt, Michigan (INS-2)
Bob Newman, Washington State (INS-2, UP-3)

Backs
John David Crow, Texas A&M  (AAB, AFCA, AP-1, FWAA, INS-1, NEA-1, SN, UP-1, Time, WC)
Walt Kowalczyk, Michigan State (AFCA, AP-2, FWAA, INS-2, NEA-1, SN, AFCA, UP-1, Time, WC)
Bob Anderson, Army (AP-2, FWAA, INS-1, NEA-1, SN, UP-1, Time, WC)
Clendon Thomas, Oklahoma (AFCA, INS-2, SN, UP-1, WC)
Jim Pace, Michigan (AAB, AP-1, INS-2, UP-2)
Dick Christy, North Carolina State (AAB, AP-1)
Bob Stransky, Colorado (AP-2, FWAA, INS-1, UP-3)
Jim Bakhtiar, Virginia (FWAA, AP-3)
Jim Taylor, LSU (FWAA, AP-3)
Don Clark, Ohio State (INS-2, UP-2)
Jim Shanley, Oregon (INS-2)
Billy Stacy, Mississippi State (INS-2)
Reddy Osborne, Texas A&M (INS-2)
Wray Carlton, Duke (INS-2)
Bobby Mulgado, Arizona State (AP-3)
Nick Pietrosante, Notre Dame (UP-3)

Key

See also
 1957 All-Atlantic Coast Conference football team
 1957 All-Big Eight Conference football team
 1957 All-Big Ten Conference football team
 1957 All-Pacific Coast Conference football team
 1957 All-SEC football team
 1957 All-Southwest Conference football team

References

All-America Team
College Football All-America Teams